The 2010 Queensland Cup season was the 15th season of Queensland's top-level statewide rugby league competition run by the Queensland Rugby League. The competition, known as the Intrust Super Cup due to sponsorship from Intrust Super, featured 12 teams playing a 25-week-long season (including finals) from March to September.

The Northern Pride won their first premiership after defeating the Norths Devils 30–20 in the Grand Final at Suncorp Stadium. Sunshine Coast Sea Eagles'  Daly Cherry-Evans was named the competition's Player of the Year, winning the Courier Mail Medal.

Teams 
In 2010, the lineup of teams remained unchanged for the second consecutive year.

Ladder

Final series 
In 2010, the competition used a modified version of the six-team finals format that they implemented a year earlier.

Grand Final 

The Norths Devils finished the regular season in second and defeated the minor premiers Souths Logan in the first week of the finals. In the preliminary final they thrashed Mackay 56–12 to qualify for the second Grand Final and their first since 1998. The Northern Pride finished fourth and defeated Wynnum Manly in an elimination final. In the preliminary final, they upset Souths Logan 28–8 to qualify for their second straight Grand Final.

First half 
The Pride started the first half on fire, scoring three tries inside the first 20 minutes. They kicked it off with a try to prop Noel Underwood in the 4th minute before centre Rod Jensen helped double his side's lead in the 15th minute. Winger Michael Bani was the next to score, stepping through some soft defence to push the Pride's lead to 18. It took 37th minutes for the Devils to finally post their first points when second rower Brendon Gibb barged over.

Second half 
The Pride regained their 18-point lead when bench forward Rod Griffin steamrolled his way through to score four minutes after the break. Norths hit back quickly this time, crossing just five minutes later through Luke Samoa. They made it back-to-back tries not long after when winger Gideon Mzembe dived over in the right corner. The comeback attempt was short lived, as the Pride scored their fifth try of the game when Nick Slyney crossed. Samoa scored off a Pride error in the 72nd minute to give his side a slight chance but it was too little too late. The Pride won their first premiership and became the second club from outside south east Queensland to lift the trophy.

Pride halfback and captain Chris Sheppard was awarded the Duncan Hall Medal in his final game before retirement.

End-of-season awards 
 Courier Mail Medal (Best and Fairest): Daly Cherry-Evans ( Sunshine Coast Sea Eagles)
 QANTAS Player of the Year (Coaches Award): Ryan Cullen ( Redcliffe Dolphins)
 Coach of the Year: Mark Beaumont ( Souths Logan Magpies)
 Rookie of the Year: Daly Cherry-Evans ( Sunshine Coast Sea Eagles)
 Representative Player of the Year: Dayne Weston ( Queensland Residents,  Burleigh Bears)

See also 

 Queensland Cup
 Queensland Rugby League

References 

2010 in Australian rugby league
Queensland Cup